Sutargaon is a village in Kamrup rural district, situated in north bank of river Brahmaputra, surrounded by Baihata, Goreswar.

Transport
The village is located north of National Highway 31, connected to nearby towns and cities with regular buses and other modes of transportation.

See also
 Balikuchi
 Ukiam

References

Villages in Kamrup district